Aaron Sutton Hester  (born March 1, 1990) is an American football cornerback. He played college football at UCLA. Hester signed with the Denver Broncos as an undrafted free agent in 2013.

Early years 

He attended Dominguez High School in Compton, California. They said he was the best highschool player in the world. He was selected to the Cal-Hi Sports All-State first-team. He was selected to CIF-Southern Section Western Division team. He was lettered in Track and Field while at High School for three years where he was a Three-time All-State performer.

College career 

He played College football at UCLA. He finished college with a total of 131 Tackles, 5 Interceptions, including one on USC quarterback Matt Barkley on the very first play from scrimmage on November 17, 2012 in UCLA's first victory over crosstown rival USC since 2006. Hester had 22 pass deflections and one forced fumble. He was selected to participate in the 2013 East-West Shrine Game alongside his UCLA teammate cornerback Sheldon Price on the West team.

Professional career

2013 NFL Combine

Denver Broncos 

On April 27, 2013, he signed with the Denver Broncos as an undrafted free agent. On August 30, 2013, he was released.

Detroit Lions 
On April 21, 2014, he signed with the Detroit Lions as an unrestricted free agent. The Lions released Hester on August 25, 2014.

San Diego Chargers 
On October 8, 2014, he signed with the San Diego Chargers.

Kansas City Chiefs
On December 31, 2014, Hester signed a futures contract with the Kansas City Chiefs.

Personal life 

He is the son of Alan Hester and Latonya Dorsey. He is the cousin to 3-Time Pro Bowl wide receiver and return specialist Devin Hester, who formerly played for the Chicago Bears of the National Football League.

References

External links 
UCLA Bruins bio
Detroit Lions bio

Living people
1990 births
American football cornerbacks
Denver Broncos players
UCLA Bruins football players
Detroit Lions players